Josefin Donat (born 22 February 1994) is a German nurse and beauty pageant titleholder who was crowned Miss Germany Universe 2014 and represented her country at the Miss Universe 2014 pageant.

Education

Pageantry

Miss Universe Germany 2014
Donat was crowned as Miss Germany Universe 2014 represented Leipzig on 31 August 2014.

Miss Universe 2014
Donat represented Germany at Miss Universe 2014 but did not place in the competition. Her national costume, dedicated to the 25th anniversary of the Fall of the Berlin Wall, placed in the Top 5 of Best National Costume but failed to place in the Top 15 semi-finalists.

References

External links
Official Miss Universe Germany website
Donat's Facebook
 http://fotograf-leipzig.blogspot.de/2011/08/fotos-vom-letzten-dienstag.html

1994 births
Living people
German beauty pageant winners
Miss Universe 2014 contestants
People from Leipzig
German female models
German women nurses
German nurses